The Medal of Extremadura is the highest institutional distinction of the Autonomous Community of Extremadura, Spain. It was established in 1986, following Decree 27/1986, of 29 April.

It is an annual award, whose number may vary, without exceeding ten medals in the same year, except those granted by courtesy or reciprocity. Such was the case in 2008, in which ten medals were handed out on an ordinary basis, but two were granted in an extraordinary manner to Queen Sofía and the former President of the Government of Extremadura, Juan Carlos Rodríguez Ibarra.

The delivery of the Medal falls to the President of the Regional Government of Extremadura, who by decree awards it, listing the merits for which the prize is obtained. However, any citizen of Extremadura or entity can submit a candidature before the regional administration, which can then be taken into consideration by a commission and subsequently approved by the Governing Council. In this case, up to five medals are reserved, leaving the rest in the judgment of the Chief Executive of Extremadura. In the case of medals for courtesy or reciprocity, the proposal is exclusive of the President.

The winners can be individuals, entities, corporations, or associations that have been outstanding in or out of Extremadura due to their merits or for the services rendered to the region. Thus, the medal has gone to people in the world of arts and sports, political personalities, local corporations, financial institutions, associations, religious congregations, and monasteries, among others.

The Medal of Extremadura is normally presented at an event held on the eve of 8 September, at the Roman Theatre of Mérida, capital city of the Autonomous Community.

Description
The Medal of Extremadura has an oval shape, with an axis greater than 60 millimeters and another smaller than 46 millimeters. The obverse has a perimeter fringe of 5 mm, divided into two parts joined by tongues. The upper part is enameled in azure, while the lower part is in gold with the inscription "Extremadura". The enameled coat of arms is housed in the interior oval. On the back, engraved in gold, is an oak leaf with the legend "Junta de Extremadura". In addition, it bears the award date of the medal and the winner's name. The Medal is worn from a braided silk cord in green, black, and white, the colors of the Flag of Extremadura.

The winners are also given an engraved silver plate, where the reason for the concession is explained, as well as a miniature reproduction of the Medal as a badge or lapel pin.

The winners, in turn, are enrolled in a Book of Honor created for this purpose.

History
The first person awarded with the Medal of Extremadura was the then King of Spain, Juan Carlos I, according to the Additional Provision of the decree by which the medal was created in 1986.

Since then, with the exception of 1987, medals have been awarded annually, to over 100 recipients in total. On each occasion, more than one Medal has been given, except in 1988, where it was only granted to the poet Jesús Delgado Valhondo.

One of them was delivered to Queen Sofía at an official reception at the Palace of Zarzuela on 23 June. The other was awarded to Juan Carlos Rodríguez Ibarra, first democratic President of the Government of Extremadura, who retired in 2007 after 24 years in office. The award ceremony was held on 21 May 2008 at the Assembly of Extremadura.

In 2010, the year in which the definitive approval of the reform of the Statute of Autonomy of Extremadura was foreseen, the Government of Extremadura granted the Medal to the Prince of Asturias at that time, Felipe de Borbón y Grecia, in an extraordinary manner as Heir to the Crown. The award ceremony took place in Trujillo on 29 April, on the occasion of an official visit by the Prince and Princess of Asturias, Felipe and Letizia, to the town's National Cheese Fair.

In 2014, after the death of Adolfo Suárez on 23 March, the regional government granted him the Medal posthumously for being the country's first democratic Prime Minister after Francoist Spain, driving the Spanish Transition to Democracy.

There have been no cases of resignation by the winners to date. The only withdrawal of the Extremadura Medal was proposed in 2014, specifically that awarded to the Paralympic swimmer Enrique Tornero in 1996, due to his judicial conviction for prevarication and fraud in his time as a councilor in the City of Plasencia.

Recipients

1986

See also
 Orders, decorations, and medals of Spain

References

External links
 

1986 establishments in Spain
Awards established in 1986
Extremaduran culture
Orders, decorations, and medals of Spain